The Meghwar Bhil also known as the Sindhi Bhil are a Sindhinised sub-group of the Bhil people who live in the Sindh, Punjab, and Balocistan provinces of Pakistan.  They are a major Hindu community in the region, and are one of the only Hindu groups in Pakistan who are known to not leave Sindh during the Partition of India.

Culture 
The Meghwar are considered by some to be a subcaste of the Chamars.  The Meghwar of Punjab are rather poor, and are peasants.  Most of them work labour jobs around the country to sustain themselves.  The Human Rights Commission of the United Nations found out that many Meghwars were actually slaves, even after Pakistan had abolished slavery of the Bhil people in 1992.  In Sindh and Balochistan, the Meghwars are far worse off than the ones in Punjab, with many being forced to convert to Islam.  Nearly 95% of the Sindhi Meghwar live in rural areas in Badin, Thatta, and Mohrano as well as in cities like Mirpur Khas, Hyderabad, and Karachi.  Many Meghwars and Kolis have converted to Ismaili Shia Islam in Khebar, Sindh.  Many Meghwars have committed suicides in Tharparkar for unknown reasons.  Many Meghwars of interior Sindh frequently sacrifice animals to their 'goddesses', a tradition which has died off in recent years.  Sunita Parmar, a member of the Meghwar Bhil community, ran for the Assembly Constituency Elections in 2018.

Language 
Many Meghwars speak Sindhi Bhil, a distinct variety of Sindhi with Sanskrit influences.  Some speak Marwari and others speak Balochi, Sindhi, and Saraiki.

References 

Bhil clans
Ethnic groups in Sindh
Hinduism in Pakistan
Hindu communities of Pakistan